Interlake was a provincial electoral division in the Canadian province of Manitoba.  It was created by redistribution in 1979, and has formally existed since the 1981 provincial election.  Previously, much of the Interlake region was included in the constituency of St. George.  As its name implies, Interlake was located between Lake Winnipeg and Lake Manitoba, in the mid-northern section of the province.

Interlake was bordered to the east by Lake Winnipeg, to the south by Lakeside and Gimli, to the north by Swan River, and to the west by Lake Manitoba.  Communities in the riding include Arborg, Riverton, Ashern, Fraserwood.  The Black and Deer Islands are also located in the riding.

Prior to the 2019 Manitoba general election, Interlake was abolished and its area was redistributed to the new riding of Interlake-Gimli.

In 1996, the riding's population was 18,653.  In 1999, the average family income was $32,570, and the unemployment rate was 10.60%.  Twenty-two per cent of the riding's residents are listed as low-income.  Almost 25% of the riding's residents have less than a Grade 9 education.

Agriculture accounts for 22% of Interlake's industry, followed by government services at 13%.

Interlake had been represented continuously by members of the New Democratic Party since its creation. That ended with the 2016 election.  In 1995, local members of the Progressive Conservative Party attempted to rig the voting results by promoting a candidate from Independent Native Voice, a minor party.  The plan was unsuccessful, but caused a major provincial scandal when its details were revealed to the public in 1998-99.

List of provincial representatives

Electoral results

1981 general election

1986 general election

1988 general election

1990 general election

1995 general election

1999 general election

2003 general election

2007 general election

2011 general election

2016 general election

Previous boundaries

References

Former provincial electoral districts of Manitoba
Physiographic provinces